Víctor Manuel Mena Coto (born 24 February 1995) is a Spanish footballer who plays as a left back for Spanish club Real Balompédica Linense .

Club career
Mena was born in Los Palacios y Villafranca, Seville, Andalusia, and was a Sevilla FC youth graduate. He made his senior debut with the C-team on 28 September 2013, starting in a 1–4 Tercera División home loss against Xerez CD.

On 10 August 2015, Mena was presented at Segunda División B club CD San Roque de Lepe. The following 8 June he signed for another reserve team, Córdoba CF B also in the third division.

On 9 June 2017, Mena renewed his contract until 2020. He made his first team debut on the following day, starting in a 2–1 Segunda División home win against Girona FC.

Ahead of the 2018–19 season, Mena was not registered neither with the first-team nor with the B's, despite being under contract. On 14 November 2018, he was loaned to third division side Salamanca CF until the following June.

On 23 July 2019, Mena signed for UD Melilla in the third division, after terminating his contract with Córdoba.

References

External links

1995 births
Living people
People from Los Palacios y Villafranca
Sportspeople from the Province of Seville
Spanish footballers
Footballers from Andalusia
Association football defenders
Segunda División players
Segunda División B players
Tercera División players
Sevilla FC C players
CD San Roque de Lepe footballers
Córdoba CF B players
Córdoba CF players
Salamanca CF UDS players
UD Melilla footballers
Real Balompédica Linense footballers